The men's 500 metres races of the 2014–15 ISU Speed Skating World Cup 3, arranged in Sportforum Hohenschönhausen, in Berlin, Germany, were held on the weekend of 5–7 December 2014.

Race one was won by Artur Waś of Poland, while Laurent Dubreuil of Canada came second, and Michel Mulder of the Netherlands came third. Mirko Giacomo Nenzi of Italy won Division B of race one, and was thus, under the rules, automatically promoted to Division A for race two. Christian Oberbichler of Switzerland set a new national record with a time of 36.15.

In race two, Waś won again, while Espen Aarnes Hvammen of Norway came second, and Dubreuil had to settle for third. Xie Jiaxuan of China won Division B of race two.

Race 1
Race one took place on Friday, 5 December, with Division B scheduled in the morning session, at 13:37, and Division A scheduled in the afternoon session, at 17:29.

Division A

Division B

Notes: NR = national record.

Race 2
Race two took place on Sunday, 7 December, with Division B scheduled in the morning session, at 09:18, and Division A scheduled in the afternoon session, at 14:59.

Division A

Division B

References

Men 0500
3